Jakrapob Penkair (born October 21, 1967) is a Thai media personality, diplomat and politician who served as a Member of Parliament for Bangkok, the Government Spokesperson of Prime Minister Thaksin Shinawatra from 2003 to 2005, and later as a Cabinet Minister to the Office of the Prime Minister from 2007 to 2008 under the premiership of Samak Sundaravej.

Following the 2006 Thai coup d'état by the Royal Thai Army, he became a key organizer of the United Front for Democracy Against Dictatorship opposed to it. He was forced to step down after allegations of lèse majesté, a legal weapon commonly used in Thailand to silence dissent, and has been in exile since the 2009 Thai political unrest.

Early life and education
Born in Bangkok to a middle-class family of five, Jakrapob was educated at Kasetsart University Laboratory School and Chulalongkorn University, where he earned a bachelor's degree in political science, before completing a master's degree at the Paul H. Nitze School of Advanced International Studies of Johns Hopkins University as a Fulbright scholar. He later received a doctor's degree from the same university.

Foreign ministry and media career
His return from the United States in 1994 was followed by a short stint at the Charoen Pokphand Group, after which he entered the foreign ministry’s information department, although he soon resigned following a dispute with his superiors. He then found employment as a news analyst at PTV.

Political career
Jakrapob's rise to prominence began in 2003 when Thaksin Shinawatra appointed him government spokesperson. He became a close aide to the prime minister, and in 2005 ran as a Thai Rak Thai candidate in that year's general election. In the aftermath of the coup which ousted Thaksin, Jakrapob became a key organiser of the United Front for Democracy Against Dictatorship (UDD).

In the wake of the People's Power Party's 2007 electoral victory Jakrapob gained a place on Samak Sundaravej's cabinet. On April 1, 2008 he was appointed an executive of two state-owned television channels with a mandate to reform them.

Allegations of lèse majesté
Although he was careful to keep his criticisms of King Bhumibol oblique, Jakrapob's known republicanism, however, rankled the military and its equally paranoid royalist establishment allies, and they were keen to see him removed from office.

Their chance came with the circulation of Thai translations of a speech Jakrapob gave in English at the Foreign Correspondents' Club of Thailand in August 2007. Because the speech, which was a critique of Thailand's perennial culture of patronage, directly attacked privy council president Prem Tinsulanonda, it provoked an outcry from the Democrats, who accused him of having insulted the palace. Although he held a press conference to profess his loyalty to the monarchy, Jakrapob readily admitted his opposition to the royal family to the United States embassy as well as his participation in the dissemination of anti-monarchist ideas at the grassroots level in order to prepare for an eventual alteration of Thailand's political order. Thaksin and Samak failed to support Jakrapob, however, leading him to resign on May 8, 2008.

UDD role and exile
Despite the negative publicity Jakrapob remained an outspoken political activities and continued to be a tireless participant in UDD activities. He became associated with the movement's radical wing and soon formed a splinter group known as "Red Siam" with former communist Surachai Danwattananusorn. Because the group became much maligned for allegedly promoting violent revolution and the dismantlement of the monarchy the mainstream UDD was forced to sever ties with Jakrapob and his allies. Surachai was sentenced to 7 1/2 years in prison in 2012 for lèse majesté, but was pardoned by the king in October 2013.

Jakrapob went into hiding following the Songkran riots, vowing to carry out a more robust campaign against the government of Abhisit Vejjajiva and his establishment patrons.

Although still living in exile, he publicly resurfaced in May 2012 as a columnist for Red Power, a red shirt publication with republican leanings. Jakrapob also wrote for another similar magazine, The Voice of Taksin, under the pseudonym "Jit Pollachan". Two of his fictional stories, which were thinly-veiled portrayals of the king and the royal family, were used by the Thai Constitutional Court of Thailand to convict Somyot Prueksakasemsuk of lèse majesté.

Despite his known republicanism, in an interview with Prachatai, he toned down his stance, expressing his admiration for the monarchy as a historical institution and a medium for national unity. He nevertheless restated his adamant belief that the monarchy needs to be depoliticised.

See also
List of fugitives from justice who disappeared

References

1967 births
Jakrapob Penkair
Jakrapob Penkair
Jakrapob Penkair
Living people
Jakrapob Penkair
Jakrapob Penkair
Refugees in Cambodia
Jakrapob Penkair
Jakrapob Penkair
Jakrapob Penkair
Jakrapob Penkair
Jakrapob Penkair
Jakrapob Penkair
Jakrapob Penkair
Jakrapob Penkair